Martin Nance (born May 26, 1983) is a marketing executive and entrepreneur who formerly played as an American football wide receiver. A graduate of Miami University, the University of Michigan and Harvard Business School, he played college football at Miami University in Ohio, where he still holds numerous receiving records.  

Nance was signed by the Buffalo Bills as an undrafted free agent in 2006. He was also a member of the Minnesota Vikings and the Pittsburgh Steelers. He earned a Super Bowl ring with the Steelers in Super Bowl XLIII against the Arizona Cardinals.

On February 10, 2021, the Vikings announced they had hired Nance to be their chief marketing officer.

Early years
Nance played high school football at Pattonville High School.

College career
Nance attended Miami University in Oxford, Ohio, where he played alongside quarterback Ben Roethlisberger.

Professional football career

Buffalo Bills
Following the 2006 NFL Draft, Nance was signed as an undrafted free agent by the Buffalo Bills. He was waived on August 28.

Minnesota Vikings
Nance then signed with the Minnesota Vikings. During his rookie season, he only saw action in the final game against the St. Louis Rams on December 31, 2006, where he recorded 4 receptions for 33 yards. After the 2008 preseason, the Vikings released him.

Pittsburgh Steelers
The Pittsburgh Steelers signed Nance to their practice squad on September 10, 2008. Nance again played with his college quarterback, Roethlisberger. After finishing the season on their practice squad, he was re-signed on February 18, 2009. He was waived on August 31.

Marketing career
Following his time in the NFL, Nance received a Master of Business Administration degree from the Ross School of Business at the University of Michigan and a certificate in executive education from Harvard University. He worked for the NFL in 2011 and then worked for PepsiCo's Gatorade division as the senior director of marketing and sports intelligence. In 2021, Nance was hired by the Vikings as chief marketing officer.

Personal life
His cousin Todd Jenkins was a wide receiver at Northwestern from 1980–1983.

References

External links
Miami RedHawks bio
Minnesota Vikings bio
Pittsburgh Steelers bio

1983 births
Living people
Players of American football from Missouri
Sportspeople from St. Louis County, Missouri
American football wide receivers
Miami RedHawks football players
Buffalo Bills players
Minnesota Vikings players
Pittsburgh Steelers players
Ross School of Business alumni